Gran City Pop: The Remixes  is a remix album by Mexican pop singer Paulina Rubio. It was released by Universal Music on April 27, 2010. It includes all the official remixes of Causa y Efecto, Ni Rosas Ni Juguetes and Algo De Ti, the three singles from the original album, Gran City Pop. It was released only on a digital format.

Track listing

 Causa y Efecto (Urban Remix)
 Ni Rosas Ni Juguetes (Mr. 305 Remix)
 Ni Rosas Ni Juguetes (Juan Magán Remix)
 Algo De Ti (Junior Caldera Remix Edit)
 Algo De Ti (Junior Caldera Remix Club)
 Algo De Ti (Juan Magán Remix Urban)
 Algo De Ti (Juan Magan Remix Dance)

References

Paulina Rubio albums
Spanish-language albums
2010 remix albums
Universal Music Group remix albums